This is a list of events from British radio in 1965.

Events

January
 27 January – Paul Simon broadcasts on BBC radio for the first time, on the Five to Ten show, discussing and playing thirteen songs, most of which will appear on The Paul Simon Song Book.

February
No events

March
7 March – Debut of the BBC Radio comedy Round the Horne hosted by Kenneth Horne. The fourth programme (28 March) introduces the camp pair Julian and Sandy (played by Hugh Paddick and Kenneth Williams), who will go on to introduce the gay and theatrical cant Polari to a regular audience which builds to 15 million.

April
No events

May
1 May – The General Overseas Service is renamed to the BBC World Service.
10 May – The name of the morning religious programme on the BBC Home Service is changed from Lift Up Your Hearts to Ten To Eight.

June
No events

July
No events

August
No events

September
No events

October
4 October – 
Debut of The World at One, the BBC radio lunchtime news and current affairs programme which will still be running as of 2020.
The BBC announces plans to introduce a new service for Asian immigrants starting the following week.
10 October – The service, broadcast on the BBC Home Service on Sunday mornings, launches with a programme called Apna Hi Ghar Samajhiye (Make Yourself at Home).

November
No events

December
31 December – Offshore "pirate" radio station Radio Scotland begins broadcasting, from LV Dunbar anchored outside U.K. territorial waters off Dunbar (not to be confused with BBC Radio Scotland).

Station debuts
31 December – Radio Scotland (1965–1967)

Programme debuts
 6 January – Petticoat Line on the BBC Home Service (1965–1979)
 7 March – Round the Horne on the BBC Light Programme (1965–1968)
 4 October – The World at One on the BBC Home Service (1965–Present)

Continuing radio programmes

1940s
 Music While You Work (1940–1967)
 Sunday Half Hour (1940–2018)
 Desert Island Discs (1942–Present)
 Family Favourites (1945–1980)
 Down Your Way (1946–1992)
 Have A Go (1946–1967)
 Housewives' Choice (1946–1967)
 Letter from America (1946–2004)
 Woman's Hour (1946–Present)
 Twenty Questions (1947–1976)
 Any Questions? (1948–Present)
 The Dales (1948–1969)
 Billy Cotton Band Show (1949–1968)
 A Book at Bedtime (1949–Present)

1950s
 The Archers (1950–Present)
 Listen with Mother (1950–1982)
 From Our Own Correspondent (1955–Present)
 Pick of the Pops (1955–Present)
 The Clitheroe Kid (1957–1972)
 My Word! (1957–1988)
 Test Match Special (1957–Present)
 The Today Programme (1957–Present)
 The Navy Lark (1959–1977)
 Sing Something Simple (1959–2001)
 Your Hundred Best Tunes (1959–2007)

1960s
 Farming Today (1960–Present)
 Easy Beat (1960–1967)
 In Touch (1961–Present)
 The Men from the Ministry (1962–1977)
 I'm Sorry, I'll Read That Again (1964–1973)

Births
4 March – Andrew Collins, DJ and broadcast journalist
17 April – Rosie Millard, arts journalist and broadcaster
17 May – Jeremy Vine, author, journalist and news presenter
31 May – Lisa I'Anson, broadcaster
4 July – Jo Whiley, DJ
16 October – Steve Lamacq, DJ
12 November – Eddie Mair, broadcast journalist and presenter
Gareth Edwards, broadcast comedy producer
Caz Graham, agricultural broadcaster
Jon Naismith, radio comedy producer

Deaths
22 December – Richard Dimbleby, broadcast journalist and presenter (born 1913)

See also 
 1965 in British music
 1965 in British television
 1965 in the United Kingdom
 List of British films of 1965

References

 
Radio
Years in British radio